Phra Nang Klao Bridge is a bridge over Chao Phraya River in the area of Mueang Nonthaburi District, Nonthaburi Province.

In addition to crossing Chao Phraya River, the bridge also connects the area between Sai Ma and Bang Kraso with Suan Yai Subdistricts together along Rattanathibet Road (Highway 302). At present, there is a parallel bridge straddling over the bridge.

Phra Nang Klao Bridge started construction in 1983 and completed 1985 (along with Pathum Thani Bridge) by the Department of Rural Roads (DRR), with a total budget of 505.77 million baht.

The bridge was named in honours King Nangklao (Rama III), the third monarch of Chakri Dynasty, who has a mother (Queen Sri Sulalai) from Nonthaburi.

The entry ramp on the east side of the river contains the Phra Nang Klao Bridge MRT Station (PP08) on MRT Purple Line.

Neighbouring places
Phra Nang Klao Hospital
Wat Chaeng Siri Samphan
Wat Noi Nok

References

Bridges completed in 1985
Bridges in Thailand
Crossings of the Chao Phraya River
1985 establishments in Thailand
Buildings and structures in Nonthaburi province